Coriole Vineyards is a winery located in the McLaren Vale wine region of South Australia.

Coriole was established by the Lloyd family in 1968, and now exports wine to the US, Canada and various countries in Europe and Asia. They produce red wines from grape varieties such as Cabernet Sauvignon, Shiraz, Sangiovese, Nebbiolo and Barbera. Their range of whites is made from grapes such as Chenin blanc, Fiano and Semillon. The business also sells olive oil, balsamic vinegar, and local cheeses.

History

The original house and barn were built around 1860, while the Shiraz vineyard was planted in 1919.

In 1962, after several changes in ownership, Coriole was sold to John Snell, who established Australia's first organic winery, Chateau Bon Sante, and built a small winery, which forms the basis of the existing modern winery.

In 1968 the property was bought by Hugh and Molly Lloyd who released the first Coriole label vintage in 1970, with the help of winemaker Graeme Stevens.

In 1985 Coriole pioneered the introduction of the Italian Sangiovese grape variety into Australia.

Here's to Now
From 2013, Coriole has played host to the Here's to Now music festival, held at the end of the year (or sometimes the first weekend in January).

Further reading
McLaren Vale by Barbara Santich 
Oz Clarke 250 Best Wines by Oz Clarke 
De meest complete wijnencyclopedie (The most complete wine encyclopedia) by T. Stevenson Dutch)

References

External links
 Coriole website
 Video about Coriole vineyard

Australian companies established in 1967
Wineries in McLaren Vale
Food and drink companies established in 1967